Bad Girls returned to ITV1 with its third series on 20 March 2001 and ended on 3 July 2001.  It consists of 16 episodes.

The third series picks up directly from the series two finale. Shell has led Fenner into her trap by luring him into her cell and stabbing him with a broken bottle she smuggled back from Bodybag's anniversary party.  Fenner almost loses his life, while Hollamby has Shell transferred to the mental health wing where she comes face-to-face with an old enemy.  Helen manages to get Nikki back into Larkhall where Helen puts an end to their relationship.  Shell and Denny escape and wreak havoc in London, as they pay Hollamby a surprise visit at her home.  Things seem to be going well for Crystal, who has recently been released from prison and is now engaged to Josh, but things are set to get worse as Shell and Denny arrive at her house.  Maxi & Tina Purvis and Al MacKenzie (aka The Peckham Bootgang) arrive on G-Wing and make their presence known to the prisoners and officers alike.  Josh has just become a prison officer, but he's in for a shock when he sees that Crystal is back on the wing.  Nikki is set for her appeal, and if she wins will she find Helen waiting for her?

Cast

Main
 Simone Lahbib as Helen Stewart
 Claire King as Karen Betts
 Mandana Jones as Nikki Wade
 Debra Stephenson as Shell Dockley
 Linda Henry as Yvonne Atkins
 Jack Ellis as Jim Fenner
 Alicya Eyo as Denny Blood
 Sharon Duncan-Brewster as Crystal Gordon
 Nathan Constance as Josh Mitchell
 Isabelle Amyes as Barbara Hunt
 Lindsey Fawcett as Shaz Wylie
 Kim Oliver as Buki Lester
 Kerry Norton as Maxi Purvis
 Victoria Bush as Tina Purvis
 Pauline Campbell as Al McKenzie
 Lisa Turner as Gina Rossi
 Paul Opacic as Mark Waddle
 Tracey Wilkinson as Di Barker
 Helen Fraser as Sylvia Hollamby
 Victoria Alcock as Julie Saunders
 Kika Mirylees as Julie Johnston

Special guest
 Kate O'Mara as Virginia O'Kane

Recurring
 Michael Higgs as Dr. Thomas Waugh
 Kate Steavenson-Payne as Charlotte Myddleton
 Philip McGough as Dr. Malcolm Nicholson
 Roland Oliver as Simon Stubberfield
 Kim Taylforth as Marilyn Fenner
 Eugene Walker as Officer Blakeson
 Danielle King as Lauren Atkins
 Ivan Kaye as Charlie Atkins
 Geoffrey Hutchings as Bobby Hollamby
 Wendi Peters as Pam Jolly
 Helen Schlesinger as Tessa Spall
 Jane Lowe as Monica Lindsay
 Steven Webb as David Saunders
 Anthonia Lanre-Ajose as Femi Bada
 Helen Grace as Caroline Lewis
 Victoria Pritchard as Trisha

Guest
 Petia Pavlova - Prison Inmate
 Sally Watts - Betty Wheeler
 Sarah Crook - DC Johnstone
 Ian Dunn - Trevor
 Nick Burnell as Mr. Meadows
 Marlene Sidaway as Mrs. Barker
 Martin Crewes as Guy Cullen
 Carl Brincat as Ian Ravenscroft
 Tim Faraday as DS Hamilton
 Clare Moody as Amanda Hunt
 Dan Fredenburgh as Greg Hunt
 John Rowe as Judge Shuttlewood
 Dione Inman as Clerk of Court
 Tom Cotcher as Mr. Jones
 Bob Barrett as Mr. Levi
 Adam Croft as TV reporter
 Paula Bacon as Fiona
 Andrew Grainger as Chris Bisset
 Hugh Lee as Mike
 Nick Clark as Newsreader
 Sarah Neville as Mrs. Warner
 Maxwell Hutcheon as Mr. Casey
 Sam Halpenny as DS Culver
 Rory MacGregor as PC Waterhouse
 Joanne Mitchell as Jude Longley
 Sara Lloyd as Jo
 Jane How as Lady Myddleton
 Mark Pegg as PO MacFarlane
 Joy Elias-Rilwan as Interpreter
 Juley McCann as Sheila
 Rachel Bavidge as DST Officer
 Shola Adewusi as Fatima Ibraham
 Selva Rasalingam as DC Patel
 Amanda Gordon as Dionne Clarke
 Maureen Beattie as Marion McLoughlin
 Danielle Lydon as Claire Walker
 David Henry as Gordon Alexander
 Bernard Gallagher as Judge Hardy
 Beth Fitzgerald as Sally Ann Howe
 Anna Maria Ashe as Newsreader
 Alberto Banderas as Spanish policeman

Episodes

Reception

Ratings

Awards and nominations
 EMMA Awards (2001) – TV Actress (Alicya Eyo ― Nominated)
 National Television Awards (2001) – Most Popular Actress (Debra Stephenson – Nominated)
 National Television Awards (2001) – Most Popular Drama (Won)
 TV Quick Awards (2001) – Best Actress (Debra Stephenson – Won)
 TV Quick Awards (2001) – Best Loved Drama (Won)

Release
The third series of Bad Girls was originally released on VHS format in the UK, consisting of 5 volumes.  The DVD was released on 25 March 2002.  A re-release DVD is expected to be released in 2011, both as a single and also in a boxset along with series four.  Series three was released in the series one-four boxset on 9 October 2006.

In Australia, series three was released on 8 September 2003 in the same cover packaging as the UK DVD.  A second release was made when it was released in the series one-eight boxset, "The Complete Collection", on 10 November 2010.  It was also released separate for the complete boxset on 9 March 2011.

References

External links
 
 List of Bad Girls episodes at Epguides

2001 British television seasons
03